The 1984 NCAA Division II men's basketball tournament involved 32 schools playing in a single-elimination tournament to determine the national champion of men's NCAA Division II college basketball as a culmination of the 1983-4 NCAA Division II men's basketball season. It was won by Central Missouri State (now known as the University of Central Missouri) and Central Missouri State's Ron Nunnally was the Most Outstanding Player.

San Francisco State's participation in the tournament was later vacated by the NCAA.

Regional participants

*denotes tie

Regionals

East - Erie, Pennsylvania 
Location: Hammermill Center Host: Gannon University

Third Place - Mansfield 94, Gannon 78

New England - New Britain, Connecticut 
Location: Kaiser Hall Host: Central Connecticut State University

Third Place - Central Connecticut 102, American International 90

Great Lakes - Owensboro, Kentucky 
Location: Owensboro Sportscenter Host: Kentucky Wesleyan College

Third Place - Bellarmine 81, Cal State Bakersfield 71

South Atlantic - Norfolk, Virginia 
Location: Norfolk Scope Host: Norfolk State University

Third Place - Randolph–Macon 69, Winston-Salem State 54

North Central - Omaha, Nebraska 
Location: UNO Fieldhouse Host: University of Nebraska at Omaha

Third Place - Nebraska–Omaha 84, Northern Michigan 81

South Central - Warrensburg, Missouri 
Location: CMSU Fieldhouse Host: Central Missouri State University

Third Place - Columbus State 65, NW Missouri State 63

West - Tacoma, Washington 
Location: Memorial Fieldhouse Host: University of Puget Sound

Third Place - Chapman 74, UC Riverside 71

South - Florence, Alabama 
Location: Flowers Hall Host: University of North Alabama

Third Place - Tampa 87, Albany State 77

*denotes each overtime played

National Quarterfinals

National Finals - Springfield, Massachusetts
Location: Springfield Civic Center Hosts: American International College and Springfield College

*denotes each overtime played

All-tournament team
 Ken Bannister (Saint Augustine's)
 Rod Drake (Kentucky Wesleyan)
 Robert Harris (North Alabama)
 Ron Nunnelly (Central Missouri State)
 Brian Pesko (Central Missouri State)

See also
 1984 NCAA Division I men's basketball tournament
 1984 NCAA Division III men's basketball tournament
 1984 NCAA Division II women's basketball tournament
 NAIA Men's Basketball Championships

External links
 2010 NCAA Men's Basketball Championship Tournament Records and Statistics: Division II men's basketball Championship
 1984 NCAA Division II men's basketball tournament jonfmorse.com

NCAA Division II men's basketball tournament
Tournament
NCAA Division II basketball tournament
NCAA Division II basketball tournament